Daria Onyśko-Korczyńska (born 30 July 1981 in Kołobrzeg) is a retired track and field sprint athlete who competed internationally for Poland.

She finished eighth in the 100 metres final at the 2006 European Athletics Championships in Gothenburg, and ninth one month later at the 2006 IAAF World Cup. She won the bronze medal in 60 metres at the 2007 European Indoor Championships.

Korczynska represented Poland at the 2008 Summer Olympics in Beijing. She competed at the 100 metres sprint and placed third in her first round heat after Oludamola Osayomi and Debbie Ferguson in a time of 11.22 seconds. She qualified for the second round in which she failed to qualify for the semi finals as her time of 11.41 was the fifth time of her race. Together with Ewelina Klocek, Dorota Jędrusińska and Marta Jeschke she also took part in the 4x100 metres relay. In their first round heat they placed fifth behind Belgium, Great Britain, Brazil and Nigeria. Their time of 43.47 seconds was the second best non-directly qualifying time and the seventh time overall out of sixteen participating nations. With this result they qualified for the final in which they replaced Jeschke with Joanna Henryka Kocielnik. In the final they were eventually disqualified.

She won the bronze medal with the Polish 4 x 100 metres relay at the 2010 European Athletics Championships.

She was part of the Polish 4 × 100 m team at the 2012 Summer Olympics.

Competition record

Personal bests
100 metres - 11.22 s (2008)
200 metres - 23.17 s (2008)

References

1981 births
Living people
Polish female sprinters
Olympic athletes of Poland
Athletes (track and field) at the 2008 Summer Olympics
Athletes (track and field) at the 2012 Summer Olympics
People from Kołobrzeg
European Athletics Championships medalists
Sportspeople from West Pomeranian Voivodeship
Śląsk Wrocław athletes
Olympic female sprinters